Revelations 23 is the second studio album by Mentallo & The Fixer, released in February 1993 by Zoth Ommog Records.

Music
Revelations 23 presented the band utilizing their densely layered compositional technique based around sequencer rhythms, dance beats and distorted vocals to create a more accessible sound. Comparatively the album presents a more polished sound than its predecessor, 1992's No Rest for the Wicked, and further use of samples. The album  Founding members Dwayne Dassing and Gary Dassing have both admitted to having an interest in astronomy, which inspired the album's cover art.

On May 16, 1995 the album was re-released by Metropolis Records and included the track "Decomposed" (Grimpen Ward Mix), which was previously only available the There Is No Time compilation by Ras Dva Records. In 2014 the album was issued as a music download by Alfa Matrix. The entire album was remastered and released on December 2, 2014 as the first disc of the Zothera box set.

Reception

Theo Kavadias of AllMusic gave Revelations 23 three out of five stars, praising the album's opening for its "epics of over seven minutes apiece" that "never seem to diminish in power" and the Mentallo & The Fixer's "use of uncomplicated and effective sounds, in addition to the abandonment of the usual song structures that most industrial music to date has adhered to, gives the focus over to the melody, which is also often very simple and has an invariably harsh intensity." Sonic Boom called the band "the new messiah of electro-horror" and praised the album's "intricate programming, unique percussion and deeply layered rhythms." Peek-A-Boo Magazine praised the band's maturation as composers and pointed to the tracks "Grim Reality", "Inhumanities", "Legion of Lepers" and "Rapid Suffocation" as being the album's highlights. A critic at Keyboard pointed to "Grim Reality" as an early example composer Gary Dassing's unique analog technique.

Track listing

Personnel
Adapted from the Revelations 23 liner notes.

Mentallo & The Fixer
 Dwayne Dassing (as The Fixer) – programming, arrangements, co-producer, illustrations, editing (9, 11)
 Gary Dassing (as Mentallo) – programming, arrangements, producer, engineering, mixing, illustrations, editing (9, 11)

Production and design
 Hype Graphics (as hype graphics/Berlin) – design
 Jon Pyre – editing (11)

Release history

References

External links 
 
 Revelations 23 at Bandcamp
 Revelations 23 at iTunes

1993 albums
Mentallo & The Fixer albums
Metropolis Records albums
Zoth Ommog Records albums